The MPBL Finals MVP Award is an annual Maharlika Pilipinas Basketball League award. It was first given after the 2018 MPBL Anta Rajah Cup Finals.

Winners

See also

Notes

References 
General

Specific

Finals Most Valuable Player Award
Maharlika Pilipinas Basketball League lists
Awards established in 2018
Basketball most valuable player awards